is a Japanese football player. He plays for Nara Club.

Club statistics

References

External links

Profile at Nara Club

1983 births
Living people
Shizuoka Sangyo University alumni
Association football people from Shizuoka Prefecture
Japanese footballers
J2 League players
J3 League players
Japan Football League players
Sagan Tosu players
Blaublitz Akita players
Nara Club players
Association football goalkeepers